Isaac Jones may refer to:

Isaac Jones, Dancer/artist, currently with Eugene Ballet
Isaac Dashiell Jones, Maryland politician
Isaac Jones (clergyman) (1804–1850), translator and curate of St Deiniol's Church, Llanddaniel Fab, Wales
Isaac Jones (sprinter), Gambian sprinter
Isaac Jones (American football), American football player
Isaac Jones (Philadelphia), Mayor of Philadelphia, Pennsylvania from 1767 to 1769
Ike Jones (born 1929), American producer and actor and former husband of actress Inger Stevens